Hades Almighty is a Norwegian black metal band from Bergen, Norway. They were formed in 1992, originally under the name Hades. The band was forced to change their name to Hades Almighty in 1998, following complaints from an American band with a prior claim to the name.

History
Hades was formed in Bergen, Norway in 1992 by ex-Immortal guitarist Jørn Inge Tunsberg and ex-Dark drummer Remi Andersen. They were later joined by Jan Otto "Janto" Garmanslund on bass and second guitarist Wilhelm Nagel. Hades' first demo, Alone Walkyng, was recorded in June 1993 at Grieghallen and produced by Pytten; this demo was later re-released on CD through the Italian label Wounded Love in 1996. In 1993, Tunsberg was convicted, along with fellow black metal musician Varg Vikernes (of Burzum), for the burning of a Norwegian church in Åsane, which led to a prison sentence. Following the release of Alone Walkyng, the band signed with Full Moon Productions and recorded their first album, ...Again Shall Be, in 1994 at Grieghallen. Guitarist Nagel left the band the same year and was replaced by Stig Hagenes.

Hades released their second album, Dawn of the Dying Sun, in 1997, recorded at Grieghallen. The band supported the release of the album with extensive touring throughout Europe and America. In 1998, the band was forced to change their name from Hades to Hades Almighty due to complaints from an American band with a prior claim to the name. Following the name-change, the band began working on their next album, as well as playing at the Wacken Open Air festival.

In 1999, the band released Millenium Nocturne, recorded in Prolog Studios in Dortmund. Hades toured Europe in support of the album with Immortal and Benediction, and a separate set of gigs in the Benelux region with Mayhem and Primordial. Hades' fourth album, Pulse of Decay, was released in 2001. The band signed a management contract with Khaoz Productions in 2003, and a record deal with Dark Essence Records in 2004. The label re-released Pulse of Decay in 2004 with bonus tracks (including a cover of Manowar's "Each Dawn I Die") and a DVD section including the video for the band's own track "Submission Equals Suicide".

In 2014, frontman Janto left Hades after 22 years due to personal reasons and was replaced by Ask Ty Arctander (of Kampfar). The new line-up released the EP Pyre Era, Black! in 2015. In 2018, Therese "Hecate" Tofting (of Fairy) joined the band as bassist.

Members

Current line-up
Ask Ty Arctander - lead vocals (2014–present)
Jørn Inge Tunsberg - lead guitar, keyboards (1992–present)
Therese "Hecate" Tofting - bass guitar, backing vocals (2018–present)
Remi Andersen - drums (1992–present)

Past members
Jan Otto "Janto" Garmanslund - lead vocals, bass guitar, keyboards (1992–present)
Wilhelm Nagel - guitar (1993–1994)
Stig Hagenes - guitar (1994–1999)

Discography

As Hades
Alone Walkyng (demo, 1993)
...Again Shall Be (1994)
Dawn of the Dying Sun (1997)

As Hades Almighty
Millennium Nocturne (1999)
The Pulse of Decay (2001)
Pyre Era, Black! (EP, 2015)

References

External links

 Official Hades Almighty website 
 Hades Almighty biography @ Rockdetector

Norwegian black metal musical groups
Musical groups established in 1992
1992 establishments in Norway
Musical groups from Bergen